The 3rd JOOX Thailand Music Awards was an awarding ceremony presented by JOOX Thailand, giving recognition to the Thai entertainment industry in the field of music for their achievements in the year 2018. Nominees in 11 out of 12 main categories were voted upon by fans through the JOOX app. Voting period started on 11 February 2019 and ended on 28 February 2019. The nominees in the Karaoke of the Year category were determined by their number of streams via the app.

The awards night was held at the KBank Siam Pic-Ganesha, Siam Square One, Bangkok, Thailand on Tuesday, 19 March 2019 and broadcast through the JOOX app with an encore presentation on PPTV.

Awards 
Nominations were announced on 11 February 2019. Winners are listed first and highlighted in bold:

Multiple nominations and awards

References 

2019
Joox